Al Farooj Fresh is an international chain of fast food restaurants based in the United Arab Emirates (UAE).  Al Farooj Fresh was the first fast-casual restaurant chain in UAE that offered foods such as shawerma sandwiches and chicken meals.

Al Farooj Fresh is a wholly owned subsidiary of Al Islami Foods, a company that provides halal food products, and has 18 branches worldwide including 14 in the UAE, 1 in Oman and 2 in Lebanon.

History 

Al-Farooj Fresh was founded by a Lebanese family in 1994, with the first branch opening at Sharjah in the United Arab Emirates that year. By 2006, the chain had expanded to a total of eight branches.

On February 25, 2006, at the Gulfood Exhibition held at the Dubai International Convention & Exhibition Centre, it was announced that Al Farooj was acquired by the Mohammed Bin Rashid  Establishment for Young Business Leaders, an organisation launched in 2002 to encourage and facilitate the development of business and entrepreneurial activity among UAE nationals.  The Establishment worked jointly with Al Islami to introduce the concept to UAE entrepreneurs after final approval of Al Islami on the franchisee selection.

In February 2008, Al Islami acquired majority shares of the Al Farooj restaurant chain, relaunching the franchise later that month with plans to expand operations to serve the Middle Eastern market. Coinciding with the relaunch of Al Farooj Fresh, Al Islami announced plans to unveil their hospitality arm, of which Al Farooj Fresh was a major part of the portfolio – along with Al Islami Cart, Al Islami Meat Shops and a number of food products. The company's expansion continued into 2009, with Al Islami revealing that they would be expanding the Al Farooj chain to 17 branches with an investment of DHS 8 million (appx $2.2 million), providing them with 17 branches worldwide consisting of 14 in the UAE, 1 in Oman and 2 in Lebanon., and Kuwait.

References

External links 
 Official Website

Fast-food franchises
Restaurant chains in the United Arab Emirates
Restaurants established in 1994
Halal restaurants